John "Bull" Polisky (January 15, 1901 – April 23, 1978) was an American football guard who played one season with the Chicago Bears of the National Football League (NFL). He first enrolled at St. Edward's University before transferring to the University of Notre Dame. He attended Bellaire High School in Bellaire, Ohio.

References

External links
Just Sports Stats

1901 births
1978 deaths
Players of American football from Pittsburgh
American football guards
St. Edward's Crusaders football players
Notre Dame Fighting Irish football players
Chicago Bears players